Pseudophilautus leucorhinus, also known as white-nosed shrub frog, pointed-nosed shrub frog, whitenose bubble-nest frog, and Marten's bush frog, was a species of frog in the family Rhacophoridae. It was endemic to Sri Lanka. It is only known from the holotype that was collected some time before 1856 from the indefinite type locality "Ceylon". Pseudophilautus wynaadensis from southwestern India has been considered conspecific with this species, but these species are now considered distinct.

Description
The holotype measures  in snout–vent length. The body is elongate. The head is dorsally flat. The tympanum is not visible and the supratympanic fold is weakly defined. The toes are partially webbed. The alcohol-preserved specimen is dorsally pale brownish-yellow. There is a darker brown interorbital bar. The upper lip is pale pale brownish-yellow. The flanks and sides of the head are dark brown, with the lower flank and inguinal zone being pale brownish-yellow. The limbs have dark-brown crossbars. The lower parts of the body are pale brown-yellow.

Habitat and conservation
The former habitat of this species is unknown. It probably had  direct development (i.e., there is no free-living larval stage). The factors leading to its extinction are unknown but probably involved habitat loss.

References

leucorhinus
Frogs of Sri Lanka
Endemic fauna of Sri Lanka
Extinct amphibians
Amphibian extinctions since 1500
Amphibians described in 1856
Taxa named by Hinrich Lichtenstein
Taxa named by Eduard von Martens
Taxonomy articles created by Polbot